Lalvani is a surname. Notable people with the surname include:

 Gulu Lalvani (born 1939), British businessman
 Dino Lalvani (born 1973), British businessman
 Kartar Lalvani (born 1931), British businessman, brother of Gulu
 Tej Lalvani (born 1974), British businessman

Sindhi-language surnames